Xanthurenic acid, or xanthurenate, is a chemical shown to induce gametogenesis of Plasmodium falciparum, the parasite that causes malaria. It is found in the gut of the Anopheles mosquito.

Xanthurenic acid is a metabolic intermediate that accumulates and is excreted by pyridoxine (vitamin B6) deficient animals after the ingestion of tryptophan.

Xanthurenic acid is suspected to be an endogenous agonist for Group II metabotropic glutamate receptors in humans. It is also known to be a potent VGLUT inhibitor, thereby preventing the movement of glutamate from the cytoplasm into synaptic vesicles, an action that it mediates via competitive blockade of vesicular glutamate transporters (Ki = 0.19 mM).
 researchers reported a marked reduction of xanthurenic acid levels in the serum of patients with schizophrenia. A recent meta-analysis showed that blood xanthurenic acid levels are lower in individuals suffering from bipolar disorder as well.

See also
 Kynurenic acid
 7-Chlorokynurenic acid

References

Quinolinols
Aromatic acids